Lisa Doorn (born 8 December 2000) is a Dutch football player. She plays for Ajax in the Dutch Vrouwen Eredivisie and has made her debut in the national team.

Club career
As a youth Doorn played for vv ZOB in her hometown Amstelveen before appearing for the centre of elitesports and education in Amsterdam. She started playing for Ajax as a seventeen year old in 2018.

International
Doorn has played for Netherlands youth teams in several age groups. On 29 November 2021 she collected her first senior cap when she replaced Kika van Es at half-time in the game against Japan.

References

External links
 SoccerDonna
 SoccerWay

2000 births
AFC Ajax (women) players
Dutch women's footballers
Eredivisie (women) players
Living people
Netherlands women's international footballers
Sportspeople from Amstelveen
Footballers from North Holland
Women's association footballers not categorized by position
21st-century Dutch women